Wilhelm Pelikan (Born in Pola (Istria) on 3 December 1893—died in Arlesheim on 17 November 1981) was a German-Austrian chemist, anthroposophist, pharmacist, gardener and anthroposophical medicine practitioner.

Life
His father was a German-Austrian government surveyor and his mother came from Dalmatia and preferred to speak Italian rather than German.

His early childhood was in Galicia. He studied chemistry in Vienna and Graz. He was called for military service in 1916, but a serious disease of the lung and heart put an end to his service. During his illness someone gave him Rudolf Steiner's Knowledge of the Higher Worlds. In 1918 he heard Steiner give a lecture in Vienna and later became his personal pupil and devoted his life to Anthroposophy.

He worked in Vienna's gold and silver refinery. 1919 Dr. Eugen Kolisko asked him to come and work at the Der Kommende Tag research institute in Stuttgart. He was involved in the anthroposophical association for academics, and gave lectures in Darmstadt and at the East-West Congress in Vienna. In 1922 Wilhelm Pelikan went to new opened laboratories of the Institute of Clinical Medicine in Stuttgart where he worked on the metal mirror preparation process.

When Der Kommende Tag was dissolved in 1924 he became head of the Weleda then established in Schwäbisch Gmünd on the advice of Rudolf Steiner and in collaboration with Mr. Oskar Schmiedel and Fritz Goette. He held this position for 40 years. Mr. Goette was business manager was able to prevent Weleda from closing down under the Nazi regime. Extremely fruitful collaboration with pharmacists Wilhelm Spiess, Walther Cloos and Hans Krueger with flow scientist Theodor Schwenk and many physicians among them Eugen Kolisko, Gottfried and Gisbert Husemann, Walther Buehler, Otto Wolff, Rudolf Treichler, Eberhard Schickler, Kurt Magerstaedt, Paul Paede, Norbert Glas, made it possible to bring Rudolf Steiner's suggestions to realization and so develop a range of anthroposophical medicines. These included typical medicines, metal mirror preparations, vegetablized metals, mineral compositions based on the model for a medicinal plant and Rh preparations. The German Weleda soon became the most important branch of the Swiss company.

Biodynamic gardener Franz Lippert, Wilhelm Pelikan started to develop a medicinal herb garden on the firm's grounds and later in Wetzgau a plateau above Schwäbisch Gmünd. In time they were able to harvest 200 different species of plants.

Wilhelm also took a special interest in staff rehearsing and performing the Oberufer Christmas plays. He made it possible for the Schwäbisch Gmünd branch of the Anthroposophical Society to meet on the firm's premises from 1935 onward. This was later named the Raphael Branch to reflect the connection between the work Weleda and the healing powers of the archangel Raphael-Mercury.

1948 Wilhelm joined the editors of Weleda Korrespondenzblätter fuer Ärzte. Many conferences were held at the Weleda Schwäbisch Gmünd centre for students, pharmacists, chemists, staff of health food and organic produce stores, NMQPs (non-medically qualified practitioners), masseurs, and physiotherapists. Pelikan produced a Goethean study of metals and medicinal plants.

Walter Roggenkamp joined Pelikan in showing the biosphere of plants, their connection with the cosmos and the creative powers working on plants from outside in illustrations done with sensitivity. The work of Wilhelm Pelikan was based on valuable work done earlier by the anthroposophical botanist Gerbert Grohmann, PhD, whose two volumes The Plant were an attempt to introduce the readers to the anthroposophical view of plant nature.

Pelikan also studied astronomy and published a small volume on Halley's comet in which he considered the spiritual nature of the comets. Mrs L. Kolisko's had worked with germinating wheat based on suggestion made by Rudolf Steiner. Pelikan took this further by excluding sources of error. Statistics of plant growth were improved in collaboration with Georg Unger, PhD from the Section for Mathematics and Astronomy at the Goetheanum. 1965 a scientific paper was published on the subject.

In 1963, at the age of 70, he retired from the firm and devoted his time to research with the assistance of Christa Krueger-Woernle who helped him after the death of Mechthild Wener. In 1965, Pelikan and his wife moved to Arlesheim to continue his researches with the Science Section of the Goetheanum. He was also active in the Anthroposophical Society at the Goetheanum.

Works
 The Secrets of Metals, Lindisfarne Books, Revised edition (2006), 
 Healing Plants: Insights through Spiritual Science, Mercury Press (1997), 
 Healing Plants volume 2, Mercury Press (2012), 
In German
 Der Halley'sche Komet: Vom Geistig-Wesenhaften der Kometen-Natur,  Philosophisch-Anthroposophischer Verlag am Goetheanum, (1985).

References

1893 births
1981 deaths
People from Pula
Swiss pharmacists
Anthroposophic medicine practitioners